The House of Krasiński (plural: Krasińscy) is the surname of a Polish noble family. Krasińska is the feminine form. 
The name derives from the village of Krasne in Masovia.
The family dates from the 14th century. Its members were landowners and politically active in Masovia, Lithuania and Halychyna. The Krasiński family has produced officers, politicians (including voivodes of Poland, members of the Senate of Poland) and bishops. Probably its most celebrated member is the 19th-century poet, Zygmunt Krasiński, one of Poland's Three Bards.

Origins 
Wratislaw Corvin is a legendary Hungarian ancestor. The family's Polish ancestry goes back to Slawek Korwin, (1412–1427), who became hereditary owner of Krasne and founded the village of "Wold Krasińska" in 1460. His grandson, Jan Korwin Krasiński is the ancestor of both the Krasne Krasiński line,  and became extinct in the 20th century and of the cadet branch, the extant Korwin Krasiński line, founded by his son, Andrea (b. 1588). It subdivided into several lines, the eldest of which was descended from Gabriel and ended with Stanisław Korwin Krasiński, who with Salomea Trzcińska had four daughters, including Franciszka Korwin-Krasińska.

History 

Wincenty Krasiński received confirmation of the coat of arms (with removal of the characteristics of Napoleonic heraldry) in the Kingdom of Poland on May 17, 1837 (or 1811 by Napoleon 1)

The Ukrainian line who used the Slepowron coat of arms can be traced back to Andrzej Krasinski who died in Bukovina in 1497 but continues to this day with descendants in England and Canada. This line includes Stanisław Krasiński, Jan Kazimierz Krasiński, Franciszka Korwin-Krasińska, Wincenty Krasiński, Zygmunt Krasiński, Władysław Krasiński and others.

Hubert Antoni Krasiński received confirmation of the count's title along with the four-field coat of arms on 18 September 1882 in Galicia.

Mszana Dolna 
Having lost property during World War 1 in Regimentarzówka (Dibrivka in modern day Ukraine), Count Henryk Piotr Krasiński of the Ukrainian Krasinskis (29 April 1866 - 20 September 1928) settled with his wife Maria Łęcki in Mszana Dolna on a small estate which was Part of Maria Leska's dowry, purchased on 16 January 1899. They lived in a manor house stylized as an English "cottage" called Folwark (Grange) or Dwór Rodziny Krasińskich (Krasinski Family manor/ mansion) built at the end of the 19th century. Taken from the family in 1945 by the communist government, it is now a Youth Educational Center with a family park and playground named after the Krasinski family: Park Miejski im.Rodziny Krasińskich (Krasiński Family City Park). In its grounds is the old winery converted in 2003 into a hotel restaurant called Folwark Stara Winiarnia (The Old Grange Winery). Their daughter, Countess Maria Krasińska, was the last owner of the estate until 1945. 

Henryk's son Marian ran some family businesses including leasing the sawmill next to the house to a Jewish family, the Feurersteins, as well as building an Olympic-size swimming pool and taught mathematics at the Mszana high school until 1945 when the communist government seized the property.

The town cemetery has a Krasinski family section where Henryk, his wife Maria Leska, daughter Franciszka Maria Krasińska (1901−1920), sons Marian (1909−1965) and Henryk (1902−1979) are all buried.

World War 2 
Members of the Ukrainian Line were forced to flee Poland at the start of World War 2. Count Hubert, son of Count Henryk, fled Warsaw with his wife Irena to France via Romania and Italy with their infant son Andrew. As a major in the Polish Air Force Hubert made his way to England to be part of the free Polish RAF posted for a while to Sealand

Count Jozef Krasinski, seventh and youngest child of Henryk Piotr Krasiński, also escaped to France and Great Britain and in 1941 became a pilot of the 301 squadron and formally assigned to the Hemswell air base becoming a captain in the Polish Air Force, and Flight Lieutenant in the RAF.

Members of the Mszana Dolna Krasinskis stayed during the war including Marian, Maria Antonia and their mother Maria. Zofia Blitz and her mother stayed at the Krasinski Manor house after relocating from Warsaw following the Warsaw uprising until the end of the war.

Notable members 
(In chronological order of year of birth)

 Stanisław Krasiński (1558–1617), castellan, voivode
 Stanisław Krasiński (1585–1649), jurist, member of parliament
 Jan Kazimierz Krasiński (1607–1669), voivode
 Ludwik Krasiński (1609–1644), military commander
 Jan Dobrogost Krasiński (1639–1717), politician
 Zofia Krasińska (died 1642 or 1643), muse
 Michał Hieronim Krasiński (1712–1784), politician
 Adam Stanisław Krasiński (1714-1800), bishop
 Kazimierz Krasiński (1725−1802), politician, military leader, member of the Great Sejm, patron of arts
 Zofia Korwin Krasińska (1718-1790), landowner, publicist, philanthropist and entrepreneur married to Antoni Lubomirski
 Franciszka Korwin-Krasińska (1742-1796), wife of Charles of Saxony, Duke of Courland
 Jan Krasiński (1756–1790), military commander
 Wincenty Krasiński (1782−1858), military leader, senator, father of the poet, Zygmunt
 Adam Stanisław Krasiński (1810 - 1891), Bishop of Vilnius 
 Zygmunt Krasiński (1812−1859), poet
Count Henryk Hubert Antoni (Humbert) Krasiński (1833 - 1890) Bacterilogist who worked with Louis Pasteur in Paris. Designed Warsaw sewage systems. Part of delegation of Polish states, who submitted demands to the Emperor Franz Joseph I. Awarded the Italian order of St. Maurice & St. Lazarus and the French badge of the Legion of Honor
 Władysław Krasiński (1844–1873), son of the poet, Zygmunt
Józef Krasiński (15 June 1914 Mszana Dolna - 3 April 1998 Canmore, Alberta, Canada) - Polish engineer, aviator and count . Military aviator, pilot of the 301 bomber squadron during World War II, decorated with the Distinguished Flying Cross and Silver Cross of the Order of Virtuti Militari , aviation engineer, lecturer at universities in Argentina and Canada.

Coat of arms

Residences

See also 
 Krasiński Square
 Three Bards

References

Bibliography 
 A. Boniecki, Herbarz polski, Warszawa 1908, t. XII.
 K. Niesiecki, Herbarz polski, Lipsk 1840, t. V.

External links 
 http://www.petergen.com/bovkalo/krasinh.html

 http://krasne.pl/135-4bc75be4e1f27.htm